Bianca Baak (born 25 January 1992) is a Dutch track and field athlete who specializes in middle-distance running. She represented Netherlands at the 2019 World Athletics Championships, competing in women's 4 × 400 metres relay.

References

External links

Dutch female middle-distance runners
1992 births
Living people
World Athletics Championships athletes for the Netherlands
Sportspeople from Almere
21st-century Dutch women